Howelsen Hill Ski Area is a small ski area located on Howelsen Hill in Steamboat Springs, Colorado. It is not a typical alpine ski area, as it includes a series of ski jumps, the largest with HS127.

History
The ski area has produced 89 Olympians in both alpine and Nordic events.

The local youth ski team, the Steamboat Springs Winter Sports Club, practices at the area, along with various ski jumpers in training, including U.S. Ski Team Jumpers.

In 1914 ski area with hill was officially opened, and ready for the second annual Steamboat Springs Winter Sports Carnival next year, as first edition was still held on smother location. This is the oldest continuously operating ski area in North America. Originally called Elk Park was renamed to Howelsen Hill in 1917, after Norwegian immigrant Karl Hovelsen who established the resort. The alpine area was established in 1931.

Howelsen Hill Ski Area has sent more skiers to international competition than any other area in North America and has the largest and most complete natural ski jumping complex in North America.

Howelsen has been the training ground for 89 Olympians making over 130 Winter Olympic appearances, 15 members of the Colorado Ski Hall of Fame, and 6 members of the National Ski Hall of fame. Howelsen Hill is open to the public and is owned and operated by the City of Steamboat Springs Parks, Open Space and Recreation Department. It was renovated in 1931, 1948, 1959, 1977 and 2001.

Ski jumping world records

References

External links 
Howelsen Hill official site
Howelsen Hill skisprungschanzen.com

Buildings and structures in Routt County, Colorado
Ski areas and resorts in Colorado
Tourist attractions in Routt County, Colorado
Ski jumping venues in the United States